William Sloane Coffin Sr. (April15, 1879December16, 1933) was an American businessman. He was a director, and later vice-president of W. & J. Sloane Company, his family's business, which was founded by his grandfather, William Sloane, from Kilmarnock, Scotland. He became president of the board of trustees of the Metropolitan Museum of Art, and founded the Hearth and Home Corporation to provide housing in downtown Manhattan, New York City.

Early life

Coffin was born on April 15, 1879 in Manhattan, New York City to Edmund Coffin Jr. and Euphemia Sloane, his brother was Henry Sloane Coffin.  He graduated from Yale College with a BA in 1900, and an MA in 1904.

Career
Coffin was a director of the family's furniture and rug business, W. & J. Sloane Company, and later its vice-president. He was elected a trustee of the Metropolitan Museum of Art in 1924, and in 1931 became president of the board of trustees.

W. & J. Sloane acquired the California Furniture Company, and in 1925 Coffin created a subsidiary, the Company of Master Craftsmen, to make Colonial Revival furniture in a factory in Flushing, Queens. Sloane was heavily involved in manufacturing and selling this style, and had another subsidiary, the Oneidacraft Company in Oneida, New York, which made it as well.

Coffin was involved in purchasing real estate properties from Trinity Church and redeveloping them.  These houses are now located in the Charlton-King-Vandam Historic District. He founded the Hearth and Home Corporation, of which he was president, in order to renovate older buildings near downtown Manhattan to provide housing for middle-class New Yorkers, which Coffin saw as a solution to the "apartment house problem" of the late 1910s and early 1920s.

In 1920, Hearth and Home purchased the entire block of mid-19th century row houses bounded by MacDougal, Sullivan, West Houston and Bleecker Streets and renovated those on MacDougal and Sullivan into spacious apartments, with the backyards of the buildings connected to form a common garden.  The New York Times said about the project on January 30, 1921 that "[Coffin's] development made a real contribution to the solution of the housing problem and is an excellent example of what can be done to other properties in the city, and the rehabilitation of homey old buildings." The buildings were sold to individual owners in 1924, but with covenants guaranteeing aesthetic continuity and no future redevelopment of the site.  These houses now make up the MacDougal-Sullivan Gardens Historic District.

Personal life
On September 14, 1920, he married Catherine Butterfield in Barnstable, Massachusetts. Together, they had a son:

 William Sloane Coffin Jr. (1924–2006), who became a clergyman and a noted peace activist.

Coffin died on December 16, 1933 at his home in Manhattan, New York City from a coronary thrombosis. He was buried in Sleepy Hollow Cemetery.

See also
Charlton-King-Vandam Historic District
MacDougal-Sullivan Gardens Historic District

References

External links
William Sloane Coffin, Sr. papers at Yale University
William Sloane Coffin Sr. portrait at the Metropolitan Museum of Art

Yale College alumni
Presidents of the Metropolitan Museum of Art
1879 births
1933 deaths
Burials at Sleepy Hollow Cemetery
American merchants
People from Manhattan